Luther Almus "Doc" Cook (June 24, 1886 – June 30, 1973) was a Major League Baseball outfielder. In 288 career games, he had a .274 batting average with three home runs and 75 RBI.

He batted left and threw right-handed. He was born in Whitt, Texas and died in Lawrenceburg, Tennessee.

Cook attended Vanderbilt University.

External links

1886 births
1973 deaths
Baseball players from Texas
New York Yankees players
Vanderbilt University alumni
Austin Senators players
Oakland Oaks (baseball) players
Memphis Chickasaws players
Dallas Giants players